Mi Casa En El Arbol was one of the successful three singles released from the self-titled solo debut of Jorge González.

Cover versions
"Mi Casa En El Arbol" was covered by Japanese version of Chilean band Victoriano.

See also
 Los Prisioneros

References

1993 singles
1993 songs
Song recordings produced by Gustavo Santaolalla